Goes tigrinus is a species of beetle in the family Cerambycidae. It was described by DeGeer in 1775, originally under the genus Cerambyx. It is known from the United States.

References

Lamiini
Beetles described in 1775
Taxa named by Charles De Geer